Typhleotris madagascariensis is a species of fish in the family Milyeringidae that is endemic to Madagascar, where it is only known from underground waters in the southwestern portion of the island.

Although considered endangered because of its restricted range and not found to be common anywhere in its range in earlier studies, recent surveys found that the species is locally abundant, occurring in especially high numbers in the Andranoilove, Andriamaniloke, Lalia and Mitoho caves. In the southern part of its range, T. madagascariensis co-occurs with T. mararybe, which is not as common or widespread. T. madagascariensis feeds on various invertebrates.

Some of the limestone caves where this fish can be found are protected by the Tsimanampetsotsa National Park, including the Mitoho Grotto tourist site. The IUCN currently assess the species as Endangered, but it has stated that further research is necessary on the taxonomic status of different populations of T. madagascarensis as the populations in unconnected cave systems may actually be allopatric species; if this is the case then the IUCN's assessment may require to be changed to Critically Endangered as the range for any individual species will be less than that for  T. madagascarensis sensu lato.

References

madagascariensis
Cave fish
Endemic fauna of Madagascar
Freshwater fish of Madagascar
Taxonomy articles created by Polbot